Peak Fitness Racing is a disbanded NASCAR team. It was owned by Hermie Sadler from 2001–2004 and Jeff Stec from 2005–2006, before it was sold.

The team was formed in 2001 by Hermie Sadler as SCORE Motorsports. Sadler fielded the No. 13 Chevrolet Monte Carlo sponsored by the Virginia Lottery for three races that year, his best finish was a 27th at Dover. The team switched to No. 02 for 2002, starting eight races and having a variety of different sponsorships. 2004 saw the car field a ride for a variety of drivers including Carl Long, Andy Belmont, and Jason Jarrett, as well as Sadler himself for 16 races. The team also fielded an entry for three races in 2002 in the Busch Series, with a best finish of 29th. They ran an additional three races in 2003, again getting a best finish of 29th. In 2004, Sadler ran 30 races in the Busch Series, but did not finish higher than 12th. Garrett Liberty drove one race at Memphis, finishing 31st.

In 2005, The team was bought by Stec who had sponsorship from PEAK Fitness, and the team switched to the number No. 66 Ford with engine support from Robert Yates Racing.  After the spring race at Dover Downs, Sadler resigned from the team and was replaced by Mike Garvey, with sponsorship from Jani-King. After Garvey did not qualify at New Hampshire, Stec parted ways with Garvey. Jimmy Spencer drove the car at the fall Michigan race.

Stec then signed Kevin Lepage to join the No. 66 team. Lepage made all but one of his attempts with at 6th place start at Kansas, 13th at Atlanta and 17th at Charlotte. Lepage finish of 21st at Charlotte and finished all but one race. Hermie Sadler returned to the team for a one-race deal at Martinsville in the fall. He finished 32nd in the Jerry Kilgore Ford.

In 2006, the team switched to the No. 61 because Haas CNC Racing and their sponsor Best Buy asked to use number No. 66 for promotional reasons.  The team missed just two races, and were hoping to expand to a second car with Carl Long driving, but that plan fell through. The team was inside the top 35, but then barely fell out once the new top 35 were locked in, leading the team to rough times. In April, the team was sold to Front Row Motorsports.

External links 
Hermie Sadler Owner Stats
Bryant Stith Owner Stats
Jeff Stec Owner Stats

2001 establishments in the United States
Defunct NASCAR teams
Defunct companies based in Virginia
Auto racing teams established in 2001
Auto racing teams disestablished in 2006